The 1874 East Gloucestershire by-election was held on 17 March 1874.  The byelection was held due to the incumbent Conservative MP, Michael Hicks Beach, becoming Chief Secretary for Ireland.  It was retained by the incumbent.

References

1874 elections in the United Kingdom
1874 in England
19th century in Gloucestershire
March 1874 events
By-elections to the Parliament of the United Kingdom in Gloucestershire constituencies
Unopposed ministerial by-elections to the Parliament of the United Kingdom in English constituencies